The regions of Taiwan are based on historical administrative divisions. However, most of the definitions are not precise.

Division into two regions
 Eastern and Western Taiwan: the Central Mountain Range separates Taiwan into east and west.
 Eastern Taiwan: Yilan, Hualien and Taitung.
 Western Taiwan: other divisions from Taipei to Pingtung.
 Northern and Southern Taiwan: Zhuoshui River, the longest river of Taiwan, flows through about the middle of the island.
 Northern Taiwan: Taipei, New Taipei, Keelung, Taoyuan, Hsinchu (City/County), Miaoli, Taichung, Changhua, and Nantou.
 Southern Taiwan: Yunlin, Chiayi (City/County), Tainan, Kaohsiung, and Pingtung.

Division into four regions
The most widely used definition is from the Council for Economic Planning and Development, Executive Yuan. This division into four regions (tetrachotomy) scheme corresponds to the prefectures under Qing dynasty rule.

Division into five regions
The scheme of division into five regions (pentachotomy) is a fusion of the tetrachotomy and hexachotomy schemes. Although no specific names are given in each division, it is the most commonly used scheme among the highest divisions of the central government. This scheme is used by the Joint Service Centers (JSC) under Executive Yuan and the jurisdiction of High Court Branches under Judicial Yuan.

Division into six regions

The division into six regions (hexachotomy) scheme corresponds to the prefectures under Japanese rule. This scheme was used for national electoral districts in the legislative elections in 1972, 1975, 1980, 1983, and 1986. The discussion of this scheme became popular after the elections of five new municipalities in 2010.

See also

 Administrative divisions of Taiwan
 Geography of Taiwan
 North–South divide in Taiwan
 Political divisions of Taiwan (1895–1945)

References